Chicago Jewish News was a newspaper mainly serving the Jewish population in Chicago. The newspaper won two Simon Rockower Awards in 2015, where it is categorized as a newspaper with a circulation of less than 15,000 copies. At its peak the newspaper had a readership of over 40,000.

The paper was founded by Joseph Aaron in 1994. He served as the paper's editor-in-chief and wrote a weekly column for the publication. The paper ceased publication after Aaron died of a heart attack outside a restaurant in Jerusalem on November 16, 2019. He was 64.

See also
List of Jewish newspapers in the United States

References

Jewish newspapers published in the United States
Weekly newspapers published in the United States
Newspapers published in Chicago

Publications disestablished in 2019
Publications established in 1994
2019 disestablishments in Illinois